Caladenia cucullata, commonly known as the hooded caladenia, is a plant in the orchid family Orchidaceae and is endemic to south-eastern Australia. It is a ground orchid with a single, sparsely hairy leaf, and up to seven white flowers with a purplish labellum.

Description
The outer surface is covered with greenish to brownish glands, the inside white and glabrous, with the petals shorter and narrower than the sepals. The dorsal sepal is broadly egg-shaped, erect near the base but bends at about 90° near the middle, forming a hood over the column. It is white with reddish-purple marks and a dark purple, pointed tip. The sides of the labellum are wavy, more or less erect and the tip is strongly curved downwards. There are four regular rows of thick, club-shaped calli which decrease in size towards the tip of the labellum. The column is bent forwards, has wavy wings and red spots. Flowering occurs from September to November.

Taxonomy and naming
Caladenia cucullata was first formally described by Robert D. FitzGerald in 1876 and the description was published in Australian Orchids. The specific epithet (cucullata) is derived from the Latin word cucullus meaning "cap", or "hood".

Distribution and habitat
Hooded caladenia grows in forests, usually in poor sandy or stony soil. In New South Wales it is found on the tablelands and western slopes south from Dubbo, in Victoria it is widespread, especially in the goldfields and in South Australia it is uncommon, only ever found in the far south-east corner within a short distance from the Victorian border.

References

cucullata
Plants described in 1876
Endemic orchids of Australia
Orchids of New South Wales
Orchids of South Australia
Orchids of Victoria (Australia)